Les Bateaux Verts is a ferry company operating a service between Saint-Tropez, Sainte-Maxime, Port Grimaud and Les Issambres.

External links
Official site

Ferry companies of France
Var (department)
Transport in Provence-Alpes-Côte d'Azur